Urata (written: 浦田) is a Japanese surname. Notable people with the surname include:

, Japanese long-distance runner
, Japanese footballer
, Japanese footballer
, Japanese singer, actor and dancer
, Japanese footballer
, Japanese astronomer

See also
 3722 Urata
 112P/Urata–Niijima
 Urata Station, a railway station in Iizuka, Fukuoka, Japan

Japanese-language surnames